Palmyra Township is located in Lee County, Illinois. As of the 2010 census, its population was 2,906 and it contained 1,201 housing units.

Geography

Demographics

References

External links
 US Census
 Cook County Official Site
 Illinois State Archives

Supervisor: Vernon Gottel

Townships in Lee County, Illinois
1849 establishments in Illinois
Townships in Illinois